Silvio Bosco Frontán Vega  (born March 24, 1984 in Paysandú, Uruguay) is an Uruguayan soccer player currently playing for Deportivo Pasto in the Colombian Categoría Primera A.

He scored a goal in the 2006 tournament final between Querétaro FC and Puebla, playing for the former. During his career, he has played in several teams in Uruguay, Argentina Mexico and nowadays, Uruguay. In September 2012 signed for the club Universitario de Sucre of Bolivia.

Career
These are the teams which Bosco has played for.

References

External links
 
 Profile at BDFA 

1984 births
Living people
Uruguayan footballers
Association football midfielders
Footballers from Paysandú
Club Atlético Platense footballers
Dorados de Sinaloa footballers
Querétaro F.C. footballers
FBC Melgar footballers
Deportivo Pasto footballers
Peruvian Primera División players
Categoría Primera A players
Uruguayan Primera División players
Uruguayan expatriate footballers
Expatriate footballers in Mexico
Expatriate footballers in Bolivia
Expatriate footballers in Peru
Expatriate footballers in Colombia
Uruguayan expatriate sportspeople in Mexico
Uruguayan expatriate sportspeople in Bolivia
Uruguayan expatriate sportspeople in Peru
Uruguayan expatriate sportspeople in Colombia